William Cassidy may refer to:
Bill Cassidy (born 1957), American politician
William A. Cassidy, American geologist
Bill Cassidy (footballer, born 1917) (1917–1962), English footballer with Gateshead
Bill Cassidy (footballer, born 1940) (1940–1995), Scottish footballer with Rotherham United, Brighton & Hove Albion, Detroit Cougars and others
William F. Cassidy (1908–2002), American military commander